Shenzhou 12 (see § Etymology) was a Chinese spaceflight launched on 17 June 2021. The flight marked the seventh crewed Chinese spaceflight and the twelfth flight of the Shenzhou program. The spacecraft carried three members of the People's Liberation Army Astronaut Corps (PLAAC) on the first flight to the Tianhe core module, the first module of the Tiangong space station. This was the first Chinese crewed spaceflight since Shenzhou 11 in 2016. 

Shenzhou 12 successfully undocked from the Tianhe core module on 16 September 2021 and subsequently performed a radial rendezvous test with the Tianhe core module, which was completed on the same day. The reentry module returned to Earth on 17 September 2021. At 92 days, the mission set a new national human spaceflight duration record, surpassing Shenzhou 11's 33 days.

Background 
Shenzhou 12 was originally planned as the second visiting mission for the experimental Tiangong-2 space station, following Shenzhou 11. In 2016, plans for a second mission to Tiangong-2 were cancelled, and Shenzhou 12 was designated as the first crewed mission to the Tiangong space station which currently consists of one module, the Tianhe module, launched on 29 April 2021. The flight marks the first of four crewed missions scheduled to dock with the Tiangong station by the end of construction in 2022.

Mission 

The spacecraft was launched on a Long March-2F launch vehicle in Jiuquan Satellite Launch Center in China's Gobi Desert on 17 June 2021. After about six-and-a-half hours flight it arrived at Chinese space station Tiangong. The mission docked with the Tianhe core module at 07:54 UTC, 17 June 2021, following the launch and successful docking of Tianzhou 2, the second flight of China's Tianzhou cargo resupply craft. Tianzhou 2 was able to remain docked, because the Tianhe core module has four docking ports, unlike China's two previous space stations which only had one.

The crew entered the Tianhe core module later at 10:48 UTC becoming the first visitors to the Tiangong space station. They will carry out tasks such as the mechanical arm operation and extravehicular activities, and verify a series of key technologies such as long-term residence in space, recycling of resources and life support of astronauts.

Two spacewalks were planned to occur during the crew's approximately three-month stay in orbit. Shenzhou 13 was in standby for any possible rescue mission.

Spacewalks 
On 4 July 2021, the first of two planned spacewalks was carried out by Liu Boming and Tang Hongbo as they left the module to conduct extravehicular activities testing next-generation space suits, installed equipment to be used on future missions and carried out a number of technical tasks, which took nearly seven hours according to the CNSA. It marked China's second successful spacewalk since Zhai Zhigang's solo spacewalk nearly 13 years ago during the Shenzhou 7 mission. The duration of the spacewalk of 6 hours and 46 minutes.

On 20 August 2021, commander Nie Haisheng and Liu Boming carried out the second scheduled spacewalk to test out spacecraft equipment, install the extra-vehicle extension pump unit and raise the panoramic camera D. The duration of the extravehicular activities took 5 hours and 55 minutes to complete.

Spacecraft 
Shenzhou 12 spacecraft is based heavily on Soyuz MS technology. Shenzhou was approved in 1992 as part of the Chinese space program Project 921, and has a design similar to the Russian Soyuz spacecraft.

In the front of the spacecraft, there is the orbital module which contains an androgynous docking ring based on APAS technology, which is used to dock to the Tianhe core module. In the middle is the reentry module containing the crew which is a scaled-up version of the Soyuz descent module. The rear of the spacecraft is the service module which is equipped with engines, fuel tanks, and solar panels.

Crew 
The crew was publicly announced in a press conference on 16 June 2021.

PLASSF Major General Nie Haisheng is a veteran of Shenzhou 6 and Shenzhou 10. Major General Liu Boming was a crew member on Shenzhou 7, while Senior Colonel Tang Hongbo made his first flight to space. By the time Shenzhou 12 completed the planned 90-day mission, Nie reached 110 days in space, a new record for a Chinese astronaut.

 Back-up crew

International participation 
Russia's Roscosmos and the European Space Agency have stated their intention of sending their own astronauts to the Chinese station. Similar cooperation could extend to hosting astronauts from some developing countries in the future. The Chinese station is also preparing to host 1,000 scientific experiments from China and other countries several of which have already been launched and are ongoing.

Aftermath 
The follow-up Tianzhou 3 uncrewed cargo resupply mission was scheduled to launch on 20 September 2021 for the Shenzhou 13 mission.

See also 
 Shenzhou 9
 Shenzhou 10
 Shenzhou 11

References

External links 
 

2021 in China
Spacecraft launched in 2021
Human spaceflights
Shenzhou program
Spacecraft which reentered in 2021
Tiangong program